Gianmarco De Feo (born 2 June 1994) is an Italian football player who plays for Imolese.

Club career
He made his Serie C debut for Savona on 6 September 2014 in a game against SPAL.

He was released from his contract with Ascoli by mutual consent on 18 December 2019.

On 31 December 2019, he signed a 2.5-year contract with Serie C club Vis Pesaro.

On 9 February 2022, De Feo signed with Imolese until the end of the season.

References

External links
 

1994 births
People from Eboli
Sportspeople from the Province of Salerno
Living people
Italian footballers
Association football forwards
S.S. Virtus Lanciano 1924 players
Savona F.B.C. players
F.C. Grosseto S.S.D. players
A.C.N. Siena 1904 players
S.S.D. Lucchese 1905 players
Ascoli Calcio 1898 F.C. players
Vis Pesaro dal 1898 players
Imolese Calcio 1919 players
Serie B players
Serie C players
Footballers from Campania